Bandhana is a 1984 Indian Kannada-language romantic drama film directed by Rajendra Singh Babu from a screenplay by H. V. Subba Rao and Rajendra Singh Babu, based on a novel of the same name by Usha Navaratnanram. The film revolves around the relationship between a surgeon, Harish and his student Nandini. The film stars Vishuvardhan as Dr. Harish and Suhasini as his protégé Nandini, along with Jai Jagadish, Roopadevi and G. K. Govinda Rao in supporting roles.

At the 32nd National Film Awards, the film was awarded the Best Feature Film in Kannada. The film also won two awards at the 1984      Karnataka State Film Awards: Best Actor for Vishnuvardhan and Best Music Director for M. Ranga Rao. In addition to this, the film also won two Filmfare Awards South: Best Actor for Vishnuvardhan and Best Actress for Suhasini. The film was a critical and commercial success and is often regarded as a classic in Kannada cinema. The film was remade in Tamil in 1985 as Prema Paasam. It was dubbed in Telugu as Dr. Nandini.

Plot
Harish is a doctor, who falls in love with his student Nandini but is too shy to express his feelings for her. When he finally musters the courage to tell her that he loves her, he finds out that she holds him in high esteem more as a teacher. She tells him she is unable to reciprocate his feelings. Nandini marries an engineer Balu, who is incidentally Harish's friend. Harish starts withdrawing into a shell. However, The Marital problems crop between Nandini and Balu because of her dedication to her career as a doctor. Harish develops a heart enlargement condition which draws Nandini closer to him in the hospital. This frustrates Balu, who accuses her of having an affair with Harish. When Nandini discovers that Balu has assaulted their house maid, she decides to leave him. Harish tries to convince Balu that his relationship with Nandini is pure but Balu misbehaves with him. Harish saves Nandini's child but dies because of his advanced heart condition. Nandini divorces her husband and moves on with her new born child.

Cast

 Vishnuvardhan as Doctor Harish
 Suhasini as Doctor Nandini
 Jai Jagadish as Balu
 Roopadevi
 G. K. Govinda Rao
 Kanchana
 Shivaram
 Mysore Lokesh
 Musuri Krishnamurthy

Production

Development 
Usha Navratnaram's novel was a literary romance that dealt with the inner feelings of the lead players. The director of the film came across the novel in 1977 and saw the potential of the story and wanted to make it into a film. Originally actress Kalpana held the rights to the script and happened to give it to Babu on request, just before her death on 12 May 1979 at the age of 35.

Casting 
When director Rajendra Singh Babu cast Vishnuvardhan for a love story like Bandhana, the industry had been skeptical, for Vishnuvardhan was known more for his action roles. But the director's faith in the actor and the way Vishnuvardhan managed the role of Dr. Harish built up reputation in the industry.

In 1983 when Babu set about to make the movie, his first choice for the heroine's role was Aarathi. But her date diary was full and the search for the heroine started. He happened to meet Suhasini who was acting with his sister, and immediately knew she was going to be Dr. Nandini. The negative role portrayed by Jai Jagadish was first offered to veteran actor Ambareesh, who refused the role.

Filming 
The film was shot in several scenic locales such as Lakya Dam, Hanumanagundi Falls, Lalitha Mahal Palace, Krishnarjuna Sagar Dam, Harangi Dam and the Grand Ashok Hotel in Bangalore.

Soundtrack

M. Ranga Rao composed the soundtrack, and the lyrics were written by R. N. Jayagopal. The album consists of four soundtracks. The track of Banna Nanna Olavina Banna was based on the tune of the track Per Qualche Dollaro In Più - Spanish Intro Opening Theme from the 1965 English-language film For a Few Dollars More. The songs of the film were chartbusters.

Release and reception
The film was certified with a U certificate on 26 July 1984 and was released in theatres on 24 August the same year.

Critical response
The film garnered widespread critical acclaim. The film was praised for its story, script, direction and soundtrack. The soundtrack of the film is considered one of the greatest in the Kannada film industry. The performance of the lead cast was also appreciated. A film critic from Screen writes: "Babu with his strong command of film-making techniques, effectively adapted the novel into a screenplay rich in visuals and external drama that are required for the medium of cinema. He also showed a penchant for filming on a grander scale like the Hindi movies of the time - be it the Holi song or the prominent presence of the grand piano in the wedding song." Vishnuvardhan's portrayal of Dr. Harish is considered one the best performances of his career. The National Film Archive of India writes in a tweet: "Recognized as among the path-breaking performances of Vishnuvardhan, he mesmerized the audiences with his portrayal of a sacrificial lover."

Box office 
The movie ran for 100 days in 18 theatres and 25 weeks in many first class theatres. The film had a 30 weeks run in two theatres (a record at the time) and completed 469 days of run in one theatre, making the film the second longest running Kannada film in theatres at the time. Bandhana went on to become the highest grossing film of year and was declared an industrial hit.

Remake
The film was remade in Tamil as Premapasam. The Tamil version released in 1985 and had Sivakumar and Revathi in lead roles. The film was directed by K. Vijayan and had musical score by Gangai Amaran.

Awards 
National Film Awards
 National Film award for Best Feature Film in Kannada - Rajendra Singh Babu (Rohini Pictures)
Karnataka State Film Awards

 Best Actor - Vishnuvardhan
 Best Music Director - M. Ranga Rao
Filmfare Awards South
 Special Award For Excellent Performance - Vishnuvardhan 
 Filmfare Award for Best Actress - Suhasini Maniratnam

Legacy 
In Bandhana, Vishnuvardhan played the role of a shy doctor who fails to express his love to a girl and ends up as a tragic hero by developing a fatal heart condition. The role of Dr. Harish brought him critical appreciation. The success of Bandhana was a turning point in Vishnu's career. He began acting in more family-oriented movies like Krishna Nee Begane Baro, Karunamayi, Sowbhagya Lakshmi, Suprabhatha and carved another niche among family audience. The film also made Dr. Vishnuvardhan - Suhasini duo a much celebrated pair onscreen. Following the immense success of Bandhana they acted together in several films like Suprabhatha, Muthina Haara and Himapaata. The song Noorondu Nenapu from this film is now considered an evergreen song and later inspired the title of a 2017 film.

References

External links
 

1980s Kannada-language films
1984 films
Films scored by M. Ranga Rao
Films based on Indian novels
Kannada films remade in other languages
Kannada literature
Best Kannada Feature Film National Film Award winners
Films directed by Rajendra Singh Babu